Light and Water is a Finlay Press title. It is a collection of forty prose poems by Gary Catalano. None of the poems takes more than a page. They are set in 10pt Baskerville with no italic, except for the book or journal titles listed in the acknowledgements; no bold; and no colour, except for Flame Red  for the title on the title page and a stripe of etching down the front cover printed in Ruby Red.
This stripe – an etching by Robin Wallace-Crabbe - matches similar etching stripes also drawn by Wallace-Crabbe on sixteen of the forty pages of text. Each stripe bleeds off the fore-edge and, indeed, bleeds over onto the next page. So there are eight etchings, each providing two stripes. The etchings were printed first on an etching press followed by the text printed on a flatbed machine.  Printing is on one side only of each sheet of Magnani paper, which is folded and bound with Japanese stabs into the spine of the French false cover. The slipcase is Kraft stock, on which a linocut by Robin Wallace-Crabbe is printed in warm red.

References

Robin Wallace Crabbe, A Shy Genre... the Artist's Book (Canberra: National Library of Australia newsletter, November 1999. www.nla.gov.au/pub/nlanews/1999/.../Supplement_Story-06.pdf
Australian Poet Library: http://www.poetrylibrary.edu.au/poets/catalano-gary
National Library of Australia Trove database: http://trove.nla.gov.au/result?q=%22Finlay+press%22
Harrison, Jennifer, 'Every night I know I have seen the best corot', Island, no. 93-94, Winter-Spring 2003, p. 175-182 (Review of Light & Water by Gary Catalano)

Australian poetry collections